Czech Mongolian or Mongolian Czech may refer to:
Czech Republic–Mongolia relations
Czechs in Mongolia
Mongolians in the Czech Republic
Multiracial people of Czech and Mongolian descent